Vasily Ilyich Safonov (6 February 185227 February 1918), also known as Wassily Safonoff, was a Russian pianist, teacher, conductor and composer.

Biography

Safonov was educated at the Imperial Alexandra Lyceum, Saint Petersburg, and at the Saint Petersburg Conservatory of Music from 1881 until 1885 under Louis Brassin. He graduated as Bachelor of Laws, and won the gold medal as a pianist of the Conservatory. He was also a pupil of Theodor Leschetizky and Nikolai Zaremba.

Safonov had several daughters. Anna Vasilyevna Timiryova (1893–1975) was a poet who spent much of her life in labor camps or in exile. Varvara Vasilievna Safonova (1895–1942), a painter, died during the siege of Leningrad. Yelena Vasilievna Safonova (1902–1980), studied painting, designed theatre costumes, and published children's books. From 1932 to 1958 she lived in exile in the city of Kursk.

Safonov was never a particularly successful composer in his own right, but was a master music educator, becoming director of the Moscow Conservatory in 1889. He was the director of the National Conservatory of Music in New York.

He was the teacher of some of the best Russian pianists, notably Alexander Scriabin, Nikolai Medtner, Josef Lhévinne and Rosina Bessie (later Lhévinne). He was also a teacher of Marthe Servine, a French-American composer and pianist. 

After retiring from teaching, Safonov became well known as a conductor. He was the conductor of the first Moscow performance of Tchaikovsky's Pathétique Symphony (No. 6), on 4/16 December 1893, seven weeks after its premiere under the composer's baton and six weeks after his death.

He conducted nearly all the principal orchestras in Europe, including the philharmonic orchestras of Berlin, Vienna and Prague, the Lamoureux Orchestra of Paris, the London Symphony, the Orchestra dell'Accademia Nazionale di Santa Cecilia and the New York Philharmonic Society.

Safonov is the first known modern conductor to have dispensed with the use of the baton, which came about when he forgot to take his baton to a rehearsal on a certain occasion; he chose to use his hands alone, and decided that from then on a baton was entirely unnecessary. Safonov died in Kislovodsk on 27 February 1918, aged 66.

His voice

References

External links
 
 

1852 births
1918 deaths
19th-century classical pianists
19th-century male musicians
Russian composers
Russian male composers
Russian conductors (music)
Russian male conductors (music)
Russian classical pianists
Russian music educators
Male classical pianists
Piano pedagogues
Honorary Members of the Royal Philharmonic Society
Saint Petersburg Conservatory alumni
Music directors of the New York Philharmonic
Pupils of Nikolai Zaremba